In the late spring of 1984, Bob Dylan and Santana set out on a twenty-seven date European tour.

Background
Bob Dylan and Carlos Santana played some of the biggest and best known European music venues including the Stade de Schaerbeek in Brussels, Belgium, Ullevi stadium in Gothenburg, Sweden, St James' Park in Newcastle upon Tyne, England, Wembley Stadium in London, England, Slane Castle in Slane, Ireland.

Dylan's band included ex-Rolling Stone Mick Taylor on guitar, ex-Faces' keyboard player Ian McLagan, drummer Colin Allen and bassist Greg Sutton.
Dylan and Santana were joined by several major musicians on the tour including Joan Baez (Hamburg, Munich, Copenhagen, Nice and Nantes), Hugues Aufray (Paris and Grenoble), Pino Daniele (Milan 24 June 1984), Van Morrison (Paris, London and Slane), Eric Clapton (London), Chrissie Hynde (London), Bono (Slane), Leslie Dowdall (Slane) and Steve Wickham (Slane).
 
Real Live was released in the winter 1984 which documented Dylan's 1984 summer, released by Columbia Records. Six songs from the album were recorded at Wembley Stadium on July 7, two songs were recorded at St. James Park on July 5 and another two were recorded at Slane Castle, Ireland on July 8.

Tour dates

References

External links

BobLinks – Comprehensive log of concerts and set lists
Bjorner's Still on the Road – Information on recording sessions and performances

Bob Dylan concert tours
Santana (band) concert tours
1984 concert tours